Airport Oaks is a suburb in Auckland, New Zealand, located north of the Auckland Airport boundaries. It is mainly commercial, with warehousing, some hotels and changes into residential towards the north.

The suburb is in the Manukau ward, one of the thirteen administrative divisions of Auckland Council.

Development

The Landing 
The Landing is a business park that cater logistics and light industrial sectors. The precinct is also known for its award-winning design and landscaped environment. The business park is being developed by Auckland Airport.

References

External links
Trans Tasman land near Airport Oaks for commercial/industrial development

Suburbs of Auckland
Warehouse districts